Yeshayahu Leibowitz (29 January 1903 – 18 August 1994) was an Israeli Orthodox Jewish public intellectual and polymath. He was a professor of biochemistry, organic chemistry, and neurophysiology at the Hebrew University of Jerusalem, as well as a prolific writer on Jewish thought and western philosophy. He was known for his outspoken views on ethics, religion, and politics. Leibowitz cautioned that the state of Israel and Zionism had become more sacred than Jewish humanist values and controversially went on to describe Israeli conduct in the occupied Palestinian territories as "Judeo-Nazi" in nature while warning of the dehumanizing effect of the occupation on the victims and the oppressors.

Biography
Yeshayahu Leibowitz was born in Riga, Russian Empire (now in Latvia) in 1903, to a religious Zionist family. His father was a lumber trader, and his cousin was a future chess grandmaster Aron Nimzowitsch. In 1919, he studied chemistry and philosophy at the University of Berlin. After completing his doctorate in 1924, he went on to study biochemistry and medicine, receiving an MD in 1934 from the University of Basel.

He immigrated to Mandate Palestine in 1935, and settled in Jerusalem. Leibowitz was married to Greta, with whom he had six children, two of whom died at young ages. His son Elia was chairman of the Tel Aviv University astrophysics department, and the longest-serving director of the Wise Observatory. Another son, Uri, was a professor of medicine at Hadassah University Medical Center. His daughter, Yiska, was a district prosecutor.

Leibowitz's sister, Nechama Leibowitz, was a world-famous biblical scholar. Leibowitz was active until his last day. He died in his sleep on 18 August 1994. Shamai Leibowitz is one of his grandchildren.

Academic and literary career

Leibowitz joined the faculty of mathematics and natural science of the Hebrew University of Jerusalem in 1936. He became a professor of biochemistry in 1941, and was promoted to the position of senior professor of organic chemistry and neurology in 1952. He taught at the Hebrew University for nearly six decades, lecturing in biochemistry, neurophysiology, philosophy, and the history of science.

Leibowitz served as the editor of the Encyclopaedia Hebraica in its early stages. Apart from his innumerable articles and essays, Leibowitz authored a wide range of books on philosophy, human values, Jewish thought, the teachings of Maimonides, and politics. Many of his lectures and discourses, including those given as part of the "Broadcast University" project run by Israeli Army Radio, were subsequently compiled and printed in book form. Leibowitz was a prolific letter writer, and his advice or comment was sought out widely. The first collection of his letters (in Hebrew) was published posthumously.

Religious philosophy
Leibowitz was an Orthodox Jew who held controversial views on the subject of halakha, or Jewish law. He wrote that the sole purpose of religious commandments was to obey God, and not to receive any kind of reward in this world or the world to come. He maintained that the reasons for religious commandments were beyond man's understanding, as well as irrelevant, and any attempt to attribute emotional significance to the performance of mitzvot was misguided and akin to idolatry. He believed that Jews should perform mitzvot solely for the sake of worshipping God and that although they could also have incidental benefit to the one performing the mitzvah, it would only be a religiously worthy act as long as the motivation was to worship God. He denied the idea of ethical mitzvot, believing that any mitzvot which set out duties towards others were duties based on a person's position before God rather than their position before their fellow man.

The essence of Leibowitz's religious outlook is that a person's faith is his commitment to obey God, meaning God's commandments, and this has nothing to do with a person's image of God. This must be so because Leibowitz thought that God cannot be described, that God's understanding is not man's understanding, and thus, all the questions asked of God are out of place. Leibowitz claimed that a person's decision to believe in God (in other words: to obey him) defines or describes that person, not God.

Leibowitz viewed God as transcending all reality as humans know it, believing that as an entity God is incomparable to any other form of reality humans can encounter, and is completely separate from the material world. He viewed human history in the natural world as having no divine significance and rejected the idea that God had set out a divine purpose in history or extended some form of providence over humanity. He did not see Torah as an account of historical and scientific truths, but rather as the source of the mitzvot or commandments on how Jews are to serve God. He believed that the stories presented as factual in the Torah were simply using literary forms within the realm of human comprehension to deliver demands on how to worship God, writing that "from the standpoint of religious faith, the Torah and the entirety of Holy Scripture must be conceived as a demand which transcends the range of human cognition - the demand to know God and serve him - a demand conveyed in various forms of human expression: prescriptions, vision, poetry, prayer, thought, and narrative." He believed that the Torah should not be read as a purely factual historical account, that the inclusion of any actual historical information in the Torah would be merely coincidental, and that all descriptions of God intervening in nature and history were not to be seen as factual but rather interpreted in terms of the messages they carry, as his ideas of God's transcendence denied that there could be any such contact between holiness and the world of the profane.

One result of this approach is that faith, which is a personal commitment to obey God, cannot be challenged by the usual philosophical problem of evil or by historical events that seemingly contradict a divine presence. When someone told Leibowitz that he stopped believing in God after the Holocaust, Leibowitz answered, "Then you never believed in God". If a person stops believing after an awful event, it shows that he only obeyed God because he thought he understood God's plan, or because he expected to see a reward. But "for Leibowitz, religious belief is not an explanation of life, nature, or history, or a promise of a future in this world or another, but a demand". He viewed the Holocaust as having no Jewish religious significance, as such a belief would contradict his ideas of God having no involvement in human affairs.

Leibowitz believed in the separation of state and religion, and held that mixing the two corrupted faith. He condemned the veneration of Jewish shrines, cynically referring to the Western Wall as the Discotel (a play on the words "discothèque" and "Kotel", a transliterated Hebrew word which literally means "wall", but capitalized refers to the Western Wall).

He was critical of Reform Judaism, calling it a "historical distortion of the Jewish religion", as well as Kabbalah, seeing them as encouraging people to not perform mitzvot for their own sake but ascribing a stated purpose to them. As Reform Judaism teaches the concept of "ethical monotheism" and Judaism as having the mission of being a "light unto the nations" and Kabbalah seeks universal redemption through the performance of mitzvot. This was in contrast to Leibowitz's idea that mitzvot should be performed solely to serve God and not for any other explicit purpose. He also claimed that placing the State of Israel, Jewish history, and Jewish culture above God was committing Avodah Zara, or idol worship.

Leibowitz did not believe in the Messianic Age as traditionally understood: "the profound religious meaning of the messianic idea consists in presenting a goal and a purpose towards which one must strive eternally. The Messiah is essentially he who always will come, he is the eternal future. The Messiah who comes, the Messiah of the present, is inevitably the false Messiah." He viewed the expectations of a literal Messianic Age as blurring the line between "religious faith aimed at the service of God and psychological yearnings for the satisfaction of human aspirations."

In his view, prayer for personal reasons, done for the needs of the person praying, was religiously meaningless and even blasphemy, as it seeks to influence God and sees God as an agent for fulfilling human needs. In his eyes, the only legitimate form of prayer was one done to fulfill commandments without any reference to the needs of the person praying.

In contrast to his strict views on some matters, he was liberal on others. On the subject of homosexuality, for example, Leibowitz believed that despite the ban on homosexual relations in Judaism, homosexuals should do their best to remain observant Jews.

Views and opinions
Although Leibowitz was a Zionist and Israeli patriot, in his later years he did not support Zionism for religious reasons but rather as an "endeavor to liberate Jews from being ruled by the Gentiles." In his view, the State of Israel had no religious significance and merely served a noble political purpose by fulfilling human needs. Despite being an Orthodox Jew, the version of Zionism he espoused was totally secular in nature. In line with his view that holiness was totally separate from the material world, Leibowitz denied that the Land of Israel was holy and that the Jews had a special right to it, writing that "the idea that a specific country or location has an intrinsic ‘holiness’ is an indubitably idolatrous idea" and that "talk of rights is pure nonsense. No nation has a right to any land."

Originally, he had been associated with religious Zionism and looked favorably on a system of law based on halakha. In the 1930s while still in Germany, he was aligned with the Mizrachi religious Zionist movement. On Zionism, he wrote that "we are presented with the opportunity and the task of realizing through and within the land of Israel the concealed power of Torah." He called for "a specific and detailed halakhic code for administering the full panoply of state functions" to demonstrate how religious parties would run the future Jewish state. He proposed a form of democratic halakhic Judaism. In the 1949 Knesset election, Leibowitz headed the United List of Religious Workers, which failed to win a seat. Following Israeli independence, Leibowitz moved away from religious Zionism. He was disappointed with the way the religious parties compromised with the secular government. In his view, they had prostituted themselves to the government to guard their own brand of religious sectarianism, subordinating religion to the government. He viewed the rabbinic leadership as morally corrupt. As a result, he became disillusioned with religious Zionism. His disillusionment was further bolstered by the Qibya massacre, which caused him to become more progressively critical of government policy. In his later philosophy, he became an outspoken defender of the complete separation between religion and state, which he was calling for by 1959. He came to view political involvement as having a corrupting influence on Judaism, and argued for the separation of religion and state for Judaism's sake. He viewed politicized religion as not being truly religious, believing that it focuses less on the demands it makes on its adherents. He was among the first Israeli intellectuals to state immediately after the 1967 Six-Day War that if the occupation continued, this would lead to the decline in moral stature.

In a 1968 essay titled "The Territories", Leibowitz postulated a hellish future:

The Arabs would be the working people and the Jews the administrators, inspectors, officials, and police—mainly secret police. A state ruling a hostile population of 1.5 to 2 million foreigners would necessarily become a secret-police state, with all that this implies for education, free speech and democratic institutions. The corruption characteristic of every colonial regime would also prevail in the State of Israel. The administration would suppress Arab insurgency on the one hand and acquire Arab Quislings on the other. There is also good reason to fear that the Israel Defense Forces, which has been until now a people's army, would, as a result of being transformed into an army of occupation, degenerate, and its commanders, who will have become military governors, resemble their colleagues in other nations.

In an interview in Haaretz newspaper, Carlo Strenger, who knew Leibowitz personally, stated: Because of his provocativeness, it's easy to miss Leibowitz’s profound moral seriousness and the great relevance of his thought today. He is often pigeonholed as belonging to the extreme left, which is a mistake. Leibowitz, never willing to bow to collective pressure, was the most unlikely of combinations: On the one hand he was a libertarian, an extreme form of classical liberalism, and believed that human beings should be free to determine their way of life without any state interference. On the other hand, he was an ultra-Orthodox Jew who insisted that the state and religion must be separated completely to avoid corrupting each other.

Leibowitz became more harshly critical of Israeli policies following the 1982 Lebanon War. He repeatedly called for Israelis to refuse to serve in the occupied territories, and warned that Israel was turning its soldiers into "Judeo-Nazis", writing that if "the law . . . can allow the use of torture as a way of getting confessions out of prisoners, then this testifies to a Nazi mentality." He supported a unilateral Israeli withdrawal from the occupied territories.

Awards and recognition

In 1993, he was selected for the Israel Prize. Before the award ceremony, Leibowitz was invited to speak to the Israel Council for Israeli–Palestinian Peace, where his controversial remarks calling upon Israeli soldiers to refuse orders triggered outrage (and Yitzhak Rabin had threatened to boycott the ceremony). The jury convened to discuss the possibility of withdrawing the prize, but Leibowitz himself announced that he would refuse to accept it, because he did not want to create antagonism when receiving the prize.

References

External links

 Yeshayahu Leibowitz (Hebrew)
 Yeshayahu Leibowitz (English)

1903 births
1994 deaths
Scientists from Riga
People from Kreis Riga
Latvian Jews
20th-century Israeli Jews
Jews from the Russian Empire
Latvian emigrants to Mandatory Palestine
Israeli Orthodox Jews
Israeli people of Latvian-Jewish descent
Israeli scientists
Israeli philosophers
Jewish chemists
Jewish philosophers
Jewish scientists
Philosophers of Judaism
20th-century Israeli philosophers
Humboldt University of Berlin alumni
Academic staff of the Hebrew University of Jerusalem
Israel Prize for special contribution to society and the State recipients